James Kennedy (30 December 1908 – 12 June 1980) was an Australian rules footballer who played with North Melbourne in the Victorian Football League (VFL).

Notes

External links 

1908 births
1980 deaths
Australian rules footballers from Victoria (Australia)
North Melbourne Football Club players